China Energy Conservation and Environmental Protection Group Corporation formerly known as China Energy Conservation Investment Corporation (CECIC) is a Beijing-based state-owned enterprise established in 1988 by the State Council of the People's Republic of China. Its investment portfolio is committed to promoting energy-saving and environmental protection technologies and projects.

CECIC has responsibility for 23 billion renminbi of investment in the national energy conservation fund for basic construction projects.  It has promoted 13 major energy-saving measures and has completed more than 3,000 large-scale energy efficient and environmental protection projects.

The president is Xiaokang Wang.

Business areas
China Energy Conservation Investment Corporation, through its subsidiaries, engages in the environmental protection, energy conservation, new and renewable energy, materials, and technology businesses. It involves in the treatment of environment, administration of water resources, production and supply of water, treatment and recycling of waste water, manufacture of anti-pollution equipment, and construction of environmental projects; power generation, and production and supply of heat, as well as manufacture of power transmission, distribution, and control equipment; manufacture of lighting devices and instruments, production of cold rolled steel strips, and manufacture of metal processing machines; hydroelectric and wind power generation, and gas supply; manufacture of new building materials, and mining and dressing of scarce and rare-earth metal ores; and manufacture of communication equipment, electronic devices, information chemical products, and equipment for public society security.

The company also provides services, such as computer software services, as well as assets management, technology venture investment, and financial and industrial services.

Subsidiaries
 China Geo-Engineering Corporation
 China Ground Source Energy Industry Group Limited
 CECEP COSTIN New Materials Group Limited
 China Metal Recycling (Holdings) Limited

See also

Suntech Power
Chint Group

References

External links
 

Investment companies of China
Conglomerate companies of China
Environmental organizations based in China
Government-owned companies of China
Companies based in Beijing
Conglomerate companies established in 1997
Financial services companies established in 1997
Renewable resource companies established in 1997
Chinese companies established in 1997